The ACT Clay Court International are two back-to-back tournaments for professional female tennis players played on outdoor clay courts. The events are classified as $60,000 ITF Women's Circuit tournaments and have been held in Canberra, Australia, since 2016.

Past finals

Singles

Doubles

External links
 

ITF Women's World Tennis Tour
Clay court tennis tournaments
Tennis tournaments in Australia
Recurring sporting events established in 2016
Sports competitions in Canberra
Tennis in the Australian Capital Territory